Uroš Medić (born April 25, 1993) is a Serbian mixed martial artist who competes in the Lightweight division of the Ultimate Fighting Championship.

Background
Born and raised in the Novi Sad suburb of Budisava, he started Judo at four years old. He also participated in kickboxing at Club Novi Sad under head coach Srdjan Nadrljanski. Uroš came to America in 2015 for college  through the "Work and Travel" program and stayed in Anchorage due to his work at Anchorage BJJ, as he was working as a coach for several years.

Mixed martial arts career

Early career
Making his MMA debut in 2016 at Alaska FC: Land of the Midnight Sun 3, he picked up his first victory beating Rob Rivera via TKO in round one, Medić would go on to finish his 4 bouts, submitting Seth Kroll in the first round via triangle choke AFC 136, Nathan Feitosa via TKO in round two at AFC 138, Jason Flowers in round one via triangle choke at AFC 142, and finally at AFC 148, he defeated Alonzo Leisholm Jr via TKO in the first round.

Dana White’s Contender Series
Medić faced Mikey Gonzalez at Dana White's Contender Series 27, on August 4, 2020. He won the fight via technical knockout and was subsequently awarded a UFC contract.

Ultimate Fighting Championship
Medić faced Aalon Cruz on March 6, 2021, at UFC 259. He won the fight via technical knockout in round one. This win earned him the Performance of the Night award.

Medić faced Jalin Turner on September 25, 2021, at UFC 266. He lost the fight via submission in round one.

Medić faced Omar Morales on May 21, 2022, at UFC Fight Night: Holm vs. Vieira. He won the fight via technical knockout in round two.

Medić was scheduled to face Mike Davis  on October 1, 2022, at UFC Fight Night 211. However, Medić was removed from the bout for undisclosed reasons.

Championships and accomplishments
 Ultimate Fighting Championships
 Performance of the Night (One time)

Mixed martial arts record

|-
|Win
|align=center|8–1
|Omar Morales
|TKO (punches)
|UFC Fight Night: Holm vs. Vieira
|
|align=center|2
|align=center|3:05
|Las Vegas, Nevada, United States
| 
|-
|Loss
|align=center|7–1
|Jalin Turner
|Submission (rear-naked choke)
|UFC 266
|
|align=center|1
|align=center|4:01
|Las Vegas, Nevada, United States
|
|-
|Win
|align=center|7–0
|Aalon Cruz
|TKO (punches)
|UFC 259
|
|align=center|1
|align=center|1:40
|Las Vegas, Nevada, United States
|
|-
|Win
|align=center|6–0
|Mikey Gonzalez
|TKO (punches)
|Dana White's Contender Series 27
|
|align=center|1
|align=center|2:12
|Las Vegas, Nevada, United States
|
|-
|Win
|align=center| 5–0
|Alonzo Leisholmn Jr.
|TKO
|Alaska FC 148
|
|align=center|1
|align=center|2:52
|Anchorage, Alaska, United States
| 
|-
|Win
|align=center|4–0
|Jason Flowers
|Submission (triangle choke)
|Alaska FC 142
|
|align=center|1
|align=center|3:38
|Anchorage, Alaska, United States
|
|-
|Win
|align=center|3–0
|Nathan Feitosa
|TKO (punches)
|Alaska FC 138
|
|align=center|2
|align=center|0:51
|Anchorage, Alaska, United States
|
|-
|Win
|align=center|2–0
|Seth Kroll
|Submission (triangle choke)
|Alaska FC 136
|
|align=center|1
|align=center|1:46
|Anchorage, Alaska, United States
|
|-
|Win
|align=center|1–0
|Robert Rivera
|TKO
|Alaska FC: Land Of The Midnight Sun 3
|
|align=center|1
|align=center|N/A
|Anchorage, Alaska, United States
|

See also 
 List of current UFC fighters
 List of male mixed martial artists

References

External links 
  
 

1993 births
Living people
Serbian male mixed martial artists
Lightweight mixed martial artists
Mixed martial artists utilizing kickboxing
Mixed martial artists utilizing judo
Ultimate Fighting Championship male fighters
Serbian male judoka